Autism Speaks Inc. is a non-profit autism awareness organization and the largest autism research organization in the United States. It sponsors autism research and conducts awareness and outreach activities aimed at families, governments, and the public. It was founded in February 2005 by Bob Wright and his wife Suzanne, a year after their grandson Christian was diagnosed with autism. The same year as its founding, the organization merged with Autism Coalition for Research and Education. It then merged with the National Alliance for Autism Research in 2006 and Cure Autism Now in 2007.

The autism rights movement and neurodiversity advocates do not see autism as a disease that needs to be cured, and have criticized Autism Speaks for seeking a cure. The word "cure" was dropped from its mission statement in 2016.

History 
Autism Speaks was founded in February 2005 by Bob Wright, vice chairman of General Electric, and his wife Suzanne, a year after their grandson Christian was diagnosed with autism. The organization was established with a $25 million donation from The Home Depot founder Bernie Marcus, who sat on its board of directors for some years. Since its founding, Autism Speaks has merged with three existing autism organizations.

Autism Speaks has combined organizations that funded peer reviewed research into genetic causes, promoted alternative theories and therapies, and advocated for people with autism. In 2005, Autism Speaks merged with the Autism Coalition for Research and Education. In early 2006, a year after its founding, Autism Speaks merged with the National Alliance for Autism Research (NAAR). NAAR, founded in 1994, was the first U.S. nonprofit organization dedicated to supporting research into causes, treatment, and cures for autism spectrum disorders. The founders comprised a small group of parents, including two psychiatrists, a lawyer and a chemistry professor. In 2007, Autism Speaks completed its merger with Cure Autism Now (CAN). CAN was founded in 1995 by Jonathan Shestack and Portia Iversen.

In January 2008, child clinical psychologist Geraldine Dawson became Autism Speaks' chief science officer. In April 2010, the organization named Yoko Ono its first "Global Autism Ambassador." Autism Speaks has used the "Wubbzy" character from Wow! Wow! Wubbzy! as a mascot. In 2019, Autism Speaks featured Julia from Sesame Street in PSAs promoting early autism screening.

In May 2015, Bob Wright resigned as chairman of the organization and was succeeded by Brian Kelly. Co-founder Suzanne Wright took a leave of absence in November 2015, following a diagnosis of pancreatic cancer. She died in July 2016.

Mark Roithmayr led Autism Speaks from 2005 to 2012. In June 2012, he was succeeded by Liz Feld who had joined the organization the same year as executive vice president of strategic communications before she was promoted to become the president. Feld was succeeded by Angela Timashenka Geiger who served in the position beginning in February 2016. In October 2021, Autism Speaks appointed Keith Wargo as its new president and CEO.

Activities 
Autism Speaks, along with its predecessor organizations, has been a source of funding for research into the causes and treatment of autism spectrum disorders; it also conducts awareness and outreach activities aimed at families, governments and the public.

Research 
Autism Speaks and its predecessor organizations have raised public awareness for autism research, raised funds directly for research, and lobbied Congress to leverage the privately raised money with much greater public funds. From 1997 to 2006, their advocacy in the areas of treatment and environmental factors shifted research priorities in the U.S. from basic research to translational and clinical research, with less emphasis on the underlying biology and greater emphasis on putting what was known to practical use.

As of 2008, Autism Speaks supported research in four main areas:
 Etiology includes genetic and environmental factors that may cause autism. This research includes searches for autism susceptibility genes, animal models for autism, environmental toxins, and maternal viral infections.
 Biology studies cells, the brain, and the body. This focuses on brain development and includes the Autism Tissue Program discussed further below.
 Diagnosis includes epidemiology, early diagnosis, and biomarkers.
 Autism therapies include medication, behavioral, and psychological interventions. It includes treatments for co-occurring medical conditions in children which are unrelated to autism, such as sleep disorders and gastrointestinal conditions that may hinder behavioral interventions, along with treatments for older individuals, and complementary and alternative medicine.

Autism Speaks funds the Autism Genetic Resource Exchange (AGRE), a DNA repository and family registry of genotypic and phenotypic information that is available to autism researchers worldwide. The AGRE was established in the 1990s by a predecessor organization, Cure Autism Now.

Autism Speaks funds the Autism Tissue Program, a network of researchers that manages and distributes brain tissues donated for autism research. These donations are rare and are a vital component of research into the causes of autism.

Autism Speaks supports the Clinical Trials Network, which focuses on new pharmacological treatments. It also supports the Toddler Treatment Network, which develops new interventions for infants and toddlers.

Autism Speaks believes that vaccines have been shown to be safe for most children, and are important for preventing serious diseases such as measles and mumps. It recognizes that some individuals may have adverse reactions, or respond poorly, to vaccines, and advocates research into identifying any subgroups of such individuals and mechanisms behind any such reactions. This has strained relations between the Wrights and their daughter Katie, the mother of an autistic boy. Katie believes her son's autism was caused by thiomersal, a preservative that was formerly common in children's vaccines in the United States; no major scientific studies have confirmed this hypothesis.

Since June 2014, Autism Speaks has partnered with Google on a project called Mssng (pronounced "missing"). Previously known as The Autism Speaks Ten Thousand Genomes Program (AUT10K), it is an open source research platform for autism that aims to collect and study the DNA of 10,000 families that have been affected by autism. The goal is to create the world's largest database of sequenced genomic information of autism run on Google's cloud-based genome database, Google Genomics. In December 2014, the pair announced a launch that will allow worldwide access to the research for further collaboration and genome analysis.

Awareness, media and events 

Autism Speaks sponsored and distributes the 2006 short film Autism Every Day, produced by Lauren Thierry and Eric Solomon. Autism Speaks staff member Alison Singer was reportedly criticized for a scene in which she said, in the presence of her autistic daughter, that when faced with having to place the girl in a school that she deemed to be terrible, she contemplated driving her car off a bridge with her child in the car. Thierry said that these feelings were not unusual among non-autistic mothers of autistic children. According to the book Battleground: The Media, Thierry instructed the families she interviewed not to do their hair, vacuum or have therapists present, and appeared with her film crew at homes without preliminary preparations, in order to authentically capture the difficulties of life with autistic children, such as autistic children throwing tantrums or physically struggling with parents.

In December 2007, Autism Speaks' founder Suzanne Wright met with Sheikha Moza bint Nasser of Qatar to urge the country to sponsor a United Nations resolution recognizing World Autism Awareness Day. Qatar introduced the resolution, and the resolution was passed and adopted without a vote by the United Nations General Assembly, primarily as a supplement to previous United Nations initiatives to improve human rights.

Wright helped launch the Autism Speaks' Light It Up Blue campaign and the annual World Focus on Autism event. Light It Up Blue is a campaign to raise awareness of autism in support of both World Autism Awareness Day, observed on April 2, and the beginning of Autism Awareness Month in the United States. As part of the campaign, statues and buildings  – including the Empire State Building in New York City and Willis Tower in Chicago along with the CN Tower in Toronto – are among more than 100 structures in at least 16 U.S. cities and nine countries around the world lit up in blue on the evening of April 1, 2010. Autism Speaks volunteers and supporters began the day at the New York Stock Exchange by ringing the opening bell in what has become a yearly tradition since 2008. In 2011, despite efforts by Autism Speaks, the White House said it would not light up blue to mark World Autism Awareness Day. In 2017, President  Donald Trump fulfilled a promise to Suzanne Wright (co-founder of Autism Speaks) by lighting the White House in blue.

In November 2013, Autism Speaks published an op-ed by co-founder Suzanne Wright. Autistic people and their families criticized the piece for using inaccurate statistics and giving an unrepresentative and exaggerated depiction of the lives of autistic people and their families. John Elder Robison, a self-advocate who serves on the science and treatment advisory boards of the organization, also resigned following the op-ed.

Views

View of autism as a disease 

Autism Speaks' past advocacy has been based on the mainstream medical view of autism as a disease: "This disease has taken our children away. It's time to get them back." This is a view that "many but not all autism scientists would endorse." In contrast, autistic activists have promoted the idea of neurodiversity and the social model of disability, asserting that autistic people are "different but not diseased," and they challenge "how we conceptualize such medical conditions."

In January 2008, an autistic blogger, upset with the portrayal of autism at Autism Speaks' website, "Getting the Word Out", created a critical parody website titled "Getting the Truth Out". It was later taken down in response to legal demands from Autism Speaks to stop using its name and logo without permission. Autism Speaks said the spoof could confuse people looking for information about autism. New parody sites were later launched by Gwen Nelson, founder of the autism rights group Aspies for Freedom.

In September 2009, Autism Speaks screened the short video I Am Autism at its annual World Focus on Autism event. The video created by Alfonso Cuarón and by Autism Speaks board member Billy Mann was criticized by autism advocates and researchers for its negative portrayal of autism. In response, the organization removed a link to the film from its website.

In response to an editorial by Steve Silberman in the Los Angeles Times criticizing Autism Speaks, then-president Liz Feld stated that one-third of autistic people also have a seizure disorder, half have serious digestive complications, 50 percent wander, and more than 30 percent are nonverbal. Feld also discussed Autism Speaks' legal achievements in providing families of those who are autistic more financial assistance and funding, and the various services and awareness initiatives the organization provided.

In October 2016, Autism Speaks removed curing autism as a goal in its mission statement. The new mission statement removed words such as "struggle," "hardship" and "crisis" to instead read in part that "Autism Speaks is dedicated to promoting solutions, across the spectrum and throughout the lifespan, for the needs of individuals with autism and their families".

Position on vaccines 

Autism Speaks formerly assigned a high priority to research into the now-discredited claim that immunization is associated with an increased risk of autism. This raised concerns among parents and scientific researchers, because "funding such research, in addition to being wasteful, unduly heightens parents' concerns about the safety of immunization."

Alison Singer, a senior executive of Autism Speaks, resigned in January 2009 rather than vote to commit money to new studies of vaccination and autism. The U.S. Interagency Autism Coordinating Committee, of which Singer was a member, voted against committing the funds; this was contrary to the Autism Speaks policy on vaccine safety research. Singer said that "there isn't an unlimited pot of money, and every dollar spent looking where we know the answer isn't is one less dollar we have to spend where we might find new answers. The fact is that vaccines save lives; they don't cause autism." She said that numerous scientific studies have disproved the link first suggested more than a decade ago and that Autism Speaks needs to "move on". Later in 2009, along with NAAR's co-founder Karen London, Singer launched the Autism Science Foundation (ASF), a nonprofit organization supporting autism research premised on the principles that autism has a strong genetic component, that vaccines do not cause autism, and that evidence-based early diagnosis and intervention are critical. Autism Speaks' founder Bob Wright called Singer's resignation "disappointing and sad", and that it is possible that autism is caused by vaccines, though this claim is scientifically inaccurate and has been rejected by all reputable medical organizations.

Eric London, a founding member of the Autism Science Foundation's Scientific Advisory Board, resigned from Autism Speaks' Scientific Affairs Committee in June 2009, saying that arguments that "there might be rare cases of 'biologically-plausible' vaccine involvement ... are misleading and disingenuous," and that Autism Speaks was "adversely impacting" autism research.

In March 2010, Autism Speaks said it would not completely abandon the idea that vaccines could cause autism and that it would support "research to determine whether subsets of individuals might be at increased risk for developing autism symptoms following vaccination".

In September 2010, a study by the U.S. Centers for Disease Control and Prevention found exposure to thimerosal, a preservative that used to be added to vaccines, does not increase a child's risk of developing autism. Responding to the study, Autism Speaks' chief science officer said that the "study adds to a large body of evidence indicating that early thimerosal exposure through vaccination does not cause autism."

In August 2014, the organization said "We strongly encourage parents to have their children vaccinated for protection against serious disease. We recognize that some parents still have concerns about vaccines, particularly if they have a child or relative with autism. We urge them to find a health practitioner who will consider their concerns and help them ensure the well-being of their child." In 2017, they took the position that, "Each family has a unique experience with an autism diagnosis, and for some it corresponds with the timing of their child's vaccinations. At the same time, scientists have conducted extensive research over the last two decades to determine whether there is any link between childhood vaccinations and autism. The results of this research is clear: Vaccines do not cause autism."

Spending 
In 2009, Disability Scoop questioned Autism Speaks about its chief science officer, Geri Dawson, who received $669,751 in compensation in 2008, including $269,721 to relocate her family from Washington to North Carolina. Autism Speaks responded that Dawson's compensation was mid-range for executives with similar positions in the nonprofit health sector, and that Dawson's move benefited Autism Speaks because she would be more accessible to its offices, science divisions, government health agencies in Washington, D.C., and her new position at the University of North Carolina at Chapel Hill.

In 2012, Autism Speaks spent $2,252,334 on compensation for current officers, directors, trustees, and key employees, which The Daily Beast portrayed as controversial. Autism Speaks' former president Mark Roithmayr had a salary of $436,314 in 2012, and Chief Science Officer Geraldine Dawson earned $465,671.

Compared to other autism-focused nonprofit organizations, Autism Speaks spends a smaller percentage of its revenue on furthering its mission. According to a 2014 report by The Daily Beast, 70.9% of Autism Speaks' revenue is devoted to directly furthering its mission, compared to 79.8% of Autistic Self Advocacy Network's revenue and 91.5% of Autism Science Foundation's revenue.

In 2018, Autism Speaks spent $19.6 million on employee benefits. Angela Geiger, the then president, earned more than $642,000, which was more than double the earnings of any other AS executive.

As of 2020, Charity Navigator gives Autism Speaks a rating of three out of four stars with a financial rating of 77 out of 100, and accountability and transparency rating of 97 out of 100.

See also 

 Autistic Pride Day
 Autism Sunday

References

External links 

 

Autism-related organizations in the United States
Organizations established in 2005
2005 establishments in New York City
Mental health organizations in New York (state)